Rodolfo Ávila (born 19 February 1987 in Lisbon, Portugal) is a Macanese racing driver. He is the current champion of the TCR China Touring Car Championship, representing the colors of Team MG Xpower.

Career
2002: Champion - Intercontinental A (Gr. B) Macau Karting
2003: Champion - Asian Formula Renault Challenge, Champion – China Formula Renault Challenge, 2nd Intercontinental A (Gr. A) Macau Karting
2004: Debut in Formula 3 (Macau Grand Prix), 2nd Asian Formula Renault Challenge
2005: 5th Asian Formula 3 Championship (1st Rookie), 16th Macau Grand Prix F3 Race, Fastest lap among Macau drivers in the Formula 3 Macau Grand Prix, finishing in 16th overall
2006: 4th British Formula Three Championship – National Class
2007: International Formula Master – Team's Champion, 1st of Macau Drivers in Macau Grand Prix F3 Race
2008: Champion - Asia SuperCar Challenge (ASCC)
2009: 4th Porsche Carrera Cup Asia
2010: 4th Porsche Carrera Cup Asia
2011: 2nd Porsche Carrera Cup Asia
2019: TCR China Championship
2020: TCR China Championship - 1st Runner's Up
2021: TCR China Championship - Champion

References

External links
 Official website
 Official Twitter
 Career statistics from Driver Database

1987 births
Living people
Sportspeople from Lisbon
Macau racing drivers
Macau people of Portuguese descent
Portuguese racing drivers
French Formula Renault 2.0 drivers
Asian Formula Renault Challenge drivers
Asian Formula Three Championship drivers
British Formula Three Championship drivers
International Formula Master drivers
TCR Asia Series drivers

Asia Racing Team drivers
Performance Racing drivers
Cram Competition drivers
Carlin racing drivers